CKNS may refer to:

 CKNS (AM), a defunct radio station in Espanola, Ontario, later superseded by CKNR-FM
 the original call sign of CHTG-FM in Caledonia, Ontario
 chemical formula of Potassium_thiocyanate